The Japanese Friendship Garden, also known as Sankei-en ( 三渓園 ) is a twelve-acre Japanese garden located within Balboa Park in San Diego, California. It is an expression of friendship between San Diego and its Japanese sister city Yokohama that binds the two cultures to create a unique experience for visitors from all over the world; over 240,000 people from across the United States and the world visit the garden annually. Representing a new concept in the development of a Japanese garden outside Japan, the Japanese Friendship Garden is designed to present an atmosphere of elegant simplicity (shibui) and quiet beauty. The garden's naturalistic design is guided by the original principles/techniques of the Japanese garden while incorporating elements of the regional San Diego landscape and climate; in terms of features, the garden is well known for its unique placement, sukiya-style buildings, koi ponds, and landscape exhibits. The Japanese Friendship Garden also hosts many local educational programs, activities, festivals, and horticultural classes that focus on the relationship between nature and Japanese culture.

The Japanese Friendship Garden was built and continues to be maintained under the philosophy that, "a garden is always in a state of change but the basic elements of trees, shrubs, rocks and water designed in natural balance create a peaceful, harmonious, and transcendental environment conducive to contemplation and meditation."

History

Japanese Tea Pavilion (1914–1941)
In Balboa Park the year 1915, San Diego opened its Panama-California Exposition. Designed to call attention to San Diego and bolster the economy, the Exposition highlighted archaeological and anthropological displays as well as advertised the agricultural potential of the southwest.

One of the popular exhibits was a Japanese "Teahouse" built just north of the Botanical Building in an area that is now occupied by the Children's Zoo.

The Teahouse was a one-story building with an open veranda where visitors to the Exposition could sit, sip tea, and enjoy a garden landscaped in a manner few had seen other than from photos of Japan.

There was a Japanese Garden adjacent to the "Teahouse" which could be described as plants, stone lanterns, bronze cranes, and a winding stream squeezed into a small space so small that everything was foreground. While the garden lacked a sense of depth or borrowing of scenery ("shakkei"), details were carefully executed by the gardeners who were well versed in the techniques of bonsai and ikebana. The overall harmony of elements was sacrificed as effects were compressed for space. In Japan there are often fences or walls surrounding the garden, but in Balboa Park at that time, there was neither fence nor wall to help create and define areas or moods.

For nearly 30 years, the Teahouse and garden were operated and maintained by the Asakawa family, who continue to this day as active members of the San Diego community. Though a symbol of the strong cultural and commercial ties that linked the two nations, the Teahouse and garden were eventually closed.

Garden Restoration (1955–1990)
In 1955, key citizens of San Diego gathered, and formulated a plan for restoring a Japanese garden in Balboa Park on an expanded site. As the first tangible symbol of this effort, the City of Yokohama presented the City of San Diego with a snow lantern in 1956. Following that in 1958, they presented the Friendship Bell, which can now be found on Shelter Island.

The San Diego Yokohama Sister City Society, whose members worked with the City of San Diego to identify the current site of the garden, acquired a Japanese Gate. They installed it just to the north of the Organ Pavilion. In. 1968, they dedicated the gate as the Charles C. Dail Memorial Japanese Gate in order to honor the commitment by the people of San Diego. The gate was near the entrance to the  set aside in Balboa Park, the eventual construction and restoration site of a Japanese garden.

In 1977, after hearing the plans by many San Diegans to reestablish a Japanese garden, Yokohama gave San Diego 100 cherry blossom trees that now blossom at the Wild Animal Park. During 1977 and 1978, a series of public conferences were held to make plans for the new garden. These events allowed the general public to get involved in the designing of Balboa's new garden.

The next step was to design a master plan. For this task, the society called upon the architectural firm of Fong & LaRocca Associates. Takeo Uesugi, the Landscape Architect and Japanese Garden Design Consultant, was to help them in planning and designing the garden. In 1979 the Department of Parks & Recreation and the City Council's Public Facilities & Recreation Committee approved the Japanese Garden Master Plan for Balboa Park. The society had a professional feasibility study completed to determine if sufficient financial support was available. Not only did funds have to be identified from San Diego, but also from a sources throughout the United States and Japan. The study showed that support for the project was strong, so with the cooperation of Mayor Pete Wilson and the City of San Diego, the new Japanese Friendship Garden was under way.

In 1985, Landscape Architect Takeshi Ken Nakajima named the garden San-Kei-En, which means garden of three types of scenery—pastoral, mountain, and lake.

The initial Master Plan was designed so that garden could be constructed in five phases, with the first opening in August 1990. While planning for the second phase, the Master Plan was changed and the phase system was discontinued.

Garden Improvement Project (1990–1999)

In September 1999, the second major improvement project for the garden was carried out and completed. The design team for this project was led by landscape architect Professor Takeo Uesugi.

The Improvement Project included:
The addition of a plaza at the upper entrance of the garden including a Tea Pavilion.
The creation of a Garden Study Center to focus on the skill and techniques of Japanese gardening.
The creation of an Exhibit Hall and Activity Center to focus on Japanese cultural plans showcased in the garden.
An expansion and a variety of enhancements relating to the entire upper garden.
The addition of a much larger garden maintenance workforce and staff.
The creation of a 10,700-gallon koi pond and adjacent waterfall.
The addition of a new Bonsai Garden.

The improvement project took two years of planning, but many of the design elements planned were ultimately built incorporated into the final plan. The Japanese Friendship Garden was closed to the public for approximately six months and re-opened September 21, 1999.

Garden Improvement Project Third Phase
Completed in 2015, the third phase of the improvement project comprised nine additional acres which included a two hundred foot cherry tree grove, large azalea and camellia garden, a water feature reminiscent of the San Diego watershed, and the state-of-the-art Inamori Pavilion.

References

External links

Japanese Friendship Garden Website

Asian-American culture in San Diego
Balboa Park (San Diego)
Japanese gardens in California